Five ships of the Argentine Navy have been named ARA Santiago del Estero after the Santiago del Estero Province of Argentina:

  a  launched in 1911 but sold to Greece before acceptance.
 , built in Italy and commissioned in 1933, served until 1960
 , formerly , commissioned in 1960 and served until 1971
 , formerly , commissioned in 1971 and served until 1981
 , is a  that was never completed due to the Argentine economic crisis of the 1980s

Argentine Navy ship names